Educational architecture is a denomination for the construction of education.

Background 

Originally, the term was only used for the physical building where education was given, for example a school. Later the term was also used for the design of the education process. An educational architect can therefore also be someone without an official architect's title. Both the methodical as the physical structure of the education influence the learning outcomes.

Examples 
Examples of educational architecture as redesign of the physical place are
 learning places instead of classrooms,
 applying standards for the indoor environment.

Examples of educational architecture as redesign of the education process are
 designing courses,
 the development of an virtual learning environment.

Also 
 Joseph Fuller, G. Topham Forrest, Sadie Morgan; architects specialised in educational architecture.
 Glenda Lappan, Robert Glaser; educational designers.
 Harvard Graduate Center; innovator of educational architecture
 The Children's Village at the Canuanã School; winner of the award "Best Building of Educational Architecture of the World" (2018)

References 

Educational buildings